Eruch Jehangirji Mistry (1922 – 14 October 1993) was an Indian cyclist. He competed in the individual and team road race events at the 1948 Summer Olympics.

References

External links
 

1922 births
1993 deaths
Sportspeople from Mumbai
Parsi people
Parsi people from Mumbai
Indian male cyclists
Olympic cyclists of India
Cyclists at the 1948 Summer Olympics